"Mamiii" (stylized in all caps) is a song recorded by American singer Becky G and Colombian singer Karol G. It was released by Kemosabe Records, RCA Records and Sony Music Latin on February 11, 2022 as the third single from Gomez's second Spanish studio album Esquemas (2022). It was written by Gomez, Giraldo, Elena Rose and Daniel Echavarría Oviedo and produced by the latter. The cover art shot by photographer Alfredo Flores. It is Gomez and Giraldo's second collaboration, following "Mi Mala (Remix)" released in February 2018. It earned both artists their highest-charting single on the Billboard Hot 100.

Commercial performance
The song reached a peak of number 15 on the US Billboard Hot 100, earning both artists their second top 40 in the nation, as well as their highest-charting single on the chart.

Music video
The original music video for the song was filmed in January 2022 in an unknown desert. It was scrapped due to having a military theme, as both Gomez and Giraldo felt it was insensitive to the current Russian invasion in Ukraine. A second music video was filmed and released on April 15, 2022. It stars Angus Cloud and Mia Khalifa and was directed by Mike Ho. Gomez and Giraldo do not appear in the music video.

Live performances
Gomez and Giraldo performed the song together live for the first time at the Coachella Valley Music and Arts Festival on April 17, 2022 and second time on April 24, 2022. On May 15, 2022, Gomez performed "Mamiii" on the 2022 Billboard Music Awards, along with "Bailé Con Mi Ex". Gomez and Giraldo performed the song together live at the Strip Love Tour in Los Angeles on October 22, 2022. Gomez performed "Mamiii" on Billboard Women in Music on March 1, 2023.

Critical reception

Accolades

Charts

Weekly charts

Monthly charts

Year-end charts

Certifications

Release history

See also
List of Billboard Hot Latin Songs and Latin Airplay number ones of 2022

References

2022 singles
2022 songs
Becky G songs
Karol G songs
Number-one singles in Spain
Reggaeton songs
Songs written by Becky G
Songs written by Karol G
Songs written by Elena Rose
Songs written by Justin Quiles
Song recordings produced by Ovy on the Drums
Spanish-language songs